Šternov is a village and administrative part of Divišov in Benešov District in the Central Bohemian Region of the Czech Republic. It has about 70 inhabitants.

References

Neighbourhoods in the Czech Republic
Villages in Benešov District